Thalassomonas  is a genus of bacteria from the family Colwelliaceae.
Thalassomonas bacteria can cause the coral diseases white plague.

References

Further reading 
 
 
 
 
 

 

Alteromonadales
Bacteria genera